Donatus Iwezuife Edafe (born 3 November 1993) is a Nigerian footballer who plays for Iraqi club Al-Nasiriya FC.

Career
In January 2020, he secured a move to Turkish Cypriot club Cihangir GSK in the Northern Cyprus KTFF Süper Lig.

On 28 March 2021, he joined Al-Nasiriya FC which is participating in the Iraq Division One with other 3 Nigerian players. On 9 May 2021, he scored in the first 7 seconds against Peshmerga FC (Match was finished 1-1). On 24 May 2021, he scored his first Hat-trick against Maysan FC (Match was finished 3–1).

References

External links
PrvaLiga profile 

KTFF Super League profile

1993 births
Living people
Nigerian footballers
Association football forwards
Nigerian expatriate footballers
Slovenian PrvaLiga players
ND Gorica players
Place of birth missing (living people)
I-League players
RoundGlass Punjab FC players
Expatriate footballers in India
Nigerian expatriate sportspeople in India
Expatriate footballers in Slovenia
Nigerian expatriate sportspeople in Slovenia
Expatriate footballers in Northern Cyprus
Nigerian expatriate sportspeople in Northern Cyprus
Expatriate footballers in Iraq
Nigerian expatriate sportspeople in Iraq
Jigawa Golden Stars F.C. players